The 1993 South Africa rugby union tour of Argentina was a series of matches played in October and November 1993 in Argentina by South Africa national rugby union team.

In the same period, also a development South African team, toured Argentina, Chile and Uruguay.

Results

Match details 

Buenos Aires: J. Luna; F. Pereyra, I.Merlo, G.Sagrera, G. Tomalino; H.Herrera, C.Barrea; S.Irazoqui, D.Rotondo, M.Viola; J.Simes, D.Pereyra (c); D,Muñoz, I.Ferreyra, A.Rodríguez Araya 
South Africa: C.Dirks; J.Oliv1er, H.Fuls, H.Le Roux, C.Williams; H.Honiball, H.Martens; R.Kruger, T. Strauss (c), M.Andrews; N.Wegner, S.Atherton; G.Kebble, N.Drotske, K.Andrews 

Rosario: Bouza; G.Romero Acuña; Molina, F.del Castillo, L.Caffaro Rossi; G.del Castillo, R.Crexell (c); L.Oviedo, P.Baraldi, Carmona; Bosicovich, R.Pérez; Céspedes, Silvetti, Promancio 
South Africa: G.Johnstone; C.Williams, P.Müller, H.Le Roux, J.Oliv1er; J.Stransky, H.Martens; R.Kruger, G.Teichmann, W.Bartmann (c); G.Wegner, M.Andrews; K.Andrews, A.Drokste, H. Le Roux

Argentina: S.Mesón (Tucumán); M.Terán (Tucumán), D.Cuesta Silva (S.I.C.), S.Salvat (Alumni), G.Jorge (Pucará); L.Arbizu (Belgrano A.C.) (c), G.Camardón (Alumni); M.Bertranou (Cuyo), G.Ugartemendía (Los Matreros), F.Fernández Bravo (Tucumán); P.Sporleder (Curupaytí), G. Llanes (La Plata R.C.); E.Noriega (Hindú), R.Le Fort (Tucumán), M.Corral (S.I.C.) 
South Africa: G.Johnstone; J.Small, P.Müller, H.Fuls, C.Williams, H.Honiball, J. Van Der Westhuizen; R.Kruger, T.Strauss, F.Pienaar (c); S. Atherton, J. Strydom; K.Andrews, A.Drotske, G.Kebble

The tour of "development" team

References 

South Africa
tour
South Africa national rugby union team tours
Rugby union tours of Argentina
tour